Food Not Bombs (FNB) is a loose-knit group of independent collectives, sharing free vegan and vegetarian food with others. The group believes that corporate and government priorities are skewed to allow hunger to persist in the midst of abundance. To demonstrate this, FNB serves surplus food gathered from grocery stores, bakeries and markets which would otherwise go to waste, or occasionally has already been thrown away. The group exhibits a form of franchise activism.

Background and principles 

Food Not Bombs is an all-volunteer global movement sharing free vegan meals as a protest against war and poverty. Each chapter collects surplus food from grocery stores, bakeries, and that would otherwise go to waste and occasionally collects items from garbage dumpsters when stores are uncooperative.  FNB also accepts donations from local farmers, then prepares free community meals which are offered to anyone who is hungry. According to FNB, the group's central beliefs are:

 Meals are always vegan or vegetarian.
 Meals are free to anyone. 
 Each chapter is independent and autonomous and makes decisions via consensus.
 Dedication to nonviolence.
 Views "food as a right not a privilege."

Coinciding with these beliefs, the groups' goals are:

 To combat poverty and homelessness
 To facilitate community gatherings of hungry people
 To allow anyone to volunteer to help cook, and then eat.

Activity

1980s 
Food Not Bombs was founded in 1980 in Cambridge, Massachusetts by anti-nuclear activists Keith McHenry, Jo Swanson, Mira Brown, Susan Eaton, Brian Feigenbaum, C.T. Lawrence Butler, Jessie Constable and Amy Rothstien. According to Keith McHenry, the name came about when he discovered that they were distributing food to the poor just across the street from a new building development for Draper Labs where, rumor had it, they were designing nuclear weapons. McHenry says that it made the group realize that "there are hungry people on one side of the street. There are people on the other that are making money making nuclear weapons. We should be called 'Food Not Bombs.'" Co-founder, Keith McHenry has volunteered for 35 years and can be found sharing food almost every week in various cities including Santa Cruz, California and Taos, New Mexico. The members' activities included providing food, marching, and protesting. They protested such things as nuclear power, United States' involvement in the Salvadoran Civil War, and discrimination against the homeless.

The first arrests for sharing free food (aka 'sharing') occurred on August 15, 1988 at the entrance to Golden Gate Park in San Francisco, California. Nine people were arrested that day, including McHenry. The city made over 1,000 arrests, and Amnesty International declared these volunteers 'prisoners of conscience'.

2000s 

In the summer of 2007, the Fort Lauderdale, FL FNB chapter began receiving systematic harassment from local law enforcement culminating in an ultimatum presented by the Fort Lauderdale police.  The police demanded the arrest of volunteers responsible for the public 'sharings'.  The following week, hundreds of supporters for FNB managed to compel local law enforcement to relent, which lasted until the 2010s.

The city of Orlando, FL enacted an ordinance prohibiting the serving of food to more than a specified number[how many?] of people without a permit. In the fall of 2007, Eric Montanez of Orlando's FNB was charged with violating Orlando's city ordinance.  On October 10, 2007, Montanez was acquitted by a jury of the charge.  FNB along with a church for the homeless (First Vagabonds Church of God) sued the city on the grounds that their food service is covered under the first amendment as a part of protected political speech and religious activity. The groups won the lawsuit and the city ordinance was overturned.  The city of Orlando appealed to the 11th U.S. Circuit Court of Appeals and subsequently won.  On August 31, 2010, the 11th U.S. Circuit Court of Appeals threw out the decision, barring Orlando from enforcing the ordinance until another hearing before a 10-judge panel could take place.

In May 2008, local business owners attempted to stop the Kitchener, Ontario, FNB group from serving meals in a highly-visible downtown location, describing the group as "supporting meat-free diets, anti-capitalism, and an end to Canada's military intervention in Afghanistan."

In April 2009, the city of Middletown, Connecticut, issued a cease-and-desist order to the local chapter of FNB. Prior to the order, the city health inspector cited the organization for distributing food without a license. In August 2009, the chapter began operating through a licensed kitchen provided by the Middletown First Church of Christ Congregational as state hearings into the matter were held.

The most widely publicized restrictions on food sharing involving FNB were the 2011 feeding bans in Florida.  Similar laws have been enacted in other jurisdictions, including Philadelphia and Houston.

2010s 
On April 20, 2011, an en banc panel of the 11th Circuit Court of Appeals upheld the Orlando ordinance as a valid "time, place and manner" regulation, reversing the initial ruling of First Vagabonds Church of God, An Unincorporated Association, Brian Nichols v. City of Orlando, Florida and removing the permanent injunction against the Orlando ordinance that was first attempted in 2007. The lawyer for Orlando FNB issued a cease and desist order to the city, saying that violating the ordinance was not an arrestable offense, and hackers claiming to be affiliated with Anonymous began issuing threats to the city of Orlando. Orlando Mayor Buddy Dyer received heavy criticism for referring to Food Not Bombs activists as "food terrorists."

On June 20, Ben Markeson was cited for holding a sign without a permit, and hackers carried through with their threats and took down the Orlando Chamber of Commerce site and a Universal Studios website in "Operation Orlando". On June 22, more arrests took place including a second arrest of McHenry. On July 1, after national and international attention and further hacks, OFNB accepted the Mayor's suggestion to move sharings to City Hall, which stopped arrests and resulted in a new, stable arrangement for Orlando's FNB.

Homeless hacktivist Christopher Doyon, also known as "Commander X", was eventually arrested for "Operation Orlando" and other activity. Soon after his arraignment he held a press statement where he admitted to all charges, but argued that the distributed denial of service attacks constituted acts of cyber-civil disobedience. On August 19, 2011, Orlando Mayor Buddy Dyer held a press conference to announce that charges against food sharers arrested in Lake Eola Park, Orlando, were dropped, resulting in a new state of compromise between Buddy Dyer's administration and Orlando Food Not Bombs.

An ordinance in Sarasota FL currently requires gatherings of 75 or more people to obtain a special event permit. Local residents are currently petitioning to reduce that number to 12, as well as to require feeders to obtain the same permit necessary for people who sell goods in public places (a $150 fee). There have been numerous other ordinances targeting the homeless, including the banning of smoking and removing park benches. Since 2009, homeless shelters in Gainesville FL could feed only 130 people at a time, leading to the formation of the Coalition To End The Meal Limit. Two years later, the meal limit and other rules were significantly changed, resulting in a victory for the Coalition to End The Meal Limit.

In November 2014, the city of Fort Lauderdale, FL enacted a sharing ban. Several Food Not Bombs activists were arrested sharing food and other acts of civil disobedience, for which they received "Civil Liberties Arrest" medals from the Broward County ACLU. Other FNB activists went on hunger strike against enforcement of the law. A court injunction stopped enforcement of the sharing ban in early December 2014 pending several court cases. On August 22, 2018, the U.S. Court of Appeals for the 11th Circuit ruled that outdoor food sharing by Food Not Bombs was protected under the First Amendment.Food Not Bombs groups were heavily involved in supporting occupation camps across the US during the  Occupy Wall Street movement. A FNB kitchen was removed in a late night police confrontation with Occupy San Francisco in mid-October. C.T. Lawrence Butler joined Occupy Boston. Keith McHenry participated in many camps and released a new FNB handbook.

A Food Not Bombs World Gathering took place August 20–26, 2012, in Tampa, Florida - the week before the Republican National Convention. In conjunction with Occupy Tampa and many other organizations, FNB activists collected and prepared food for hundreds of RNC protesters and offered workshops, cultural events, and protest activities from August 20–30.

Near the end of 2012, FNB activists, in particular, Long Island FNB, fed countless thousands of people in the wake of Superstorm Sandy alongside "Occupy Sandy." The outpouring of food going to waste and support for disaster-stricken, impoverished communities culminated in the "Largest Food Not Bombs Ever" at the "Hempstead Food Share Bonanza" on Nov. 18th.

See also 

 Bill Emerson Good Samaritan Act of 1996
 Curry Without Worry
 DIY ethic
Dumpster diving
 Freeganism
 Give-away shop
 Homeless ministry
 Langar, a centuries-old tradition where vegetarian meals are supplied free of charge to the hungry at Sikh temples worldwide.
 Langar (Sufism), an Islamic tradition where free food is provided.
 One World Cafe
 Rumford's Soup
 SAME Cafe
 Volxkuche, a type of food kitchen with a secular / alternative culture character.

References

Further reading

Further reading 
 
 "Food Fight," New Times Broward-Palm Beach
 "Free Lunch," Houston Press
 "Diving for Dinner," Washington Post

External links 

 
 Account of Food Not Bombs in Be’er Sheva, Israel
 A Critical History of Harrisonburg Food Not Bombs by Peter Gelderloos
 Across From City Hall 1989 video
 Fugazi Free Concert Celebrating 20 Years of Food Not Bombs / San Francisco
 Richmond Virginia Food Not Bombs Chapter Official Site

Peace organizations based in the United States
Anti–Iraq War groups
Hunger relief organizations
Anti-nuclear movement
International anarchist organizations
Anarcho-punk
Green anarchism
Veganism
DIY culture
Food waste